Vygaudas Ušackas (born 16 December 1964 in Skuodas, Lithuania) is Member of the Board of Directors of a Lithuanian born European-American company Avia Solutions Group, which is a Leader in End-to-End Capacity Provider for Passenger and Cargo Airlines Worldwide.   

Vygaudas Usackas is a former Lithuanian diplomat, from September 2013  to October 2017 he served as the European Union's Ambassador to Russia. Prior to that he served as the EU Special Representative for Afghanistan. Prior to heading Lithuania's Ministry of Foreign Affairs, Ušackas was the Ambassador of Lithuania to the United States and Mexico from 2001 through 2006, then Ambassador to the United Kingdom. Founder of Mission Siberia.

Early life and education
Vygaudas Ušackas was born in 1964 in Skuodas, Lithuania.

In 1982 he finished Skuodas school and enrolled to the Vilnius University, there he received law degree in 1990. Later he continued his studies at the University of Oslo, Norway and the Aarhus University, Denmark, specializing in international politics and trade.

Diplomatic Service
Between 1992 and 1996 he worked as an adviser to Lithuania's mission to NATO and European Community, soon afterwards he assumed post Ministry of Foreign Affairs. Between 2000 and 2001 he was the chief negotiator of Lithuania's accession to the European Union.

After the 2008 election, Andrius Kubilius presented Vygaudas Ušackas as candidate for the position of Minister of Foreign Affairs to President Valdas Adamkus.

On 22 March 2010 he was appointed by Catherine Ashton as the European Union's special envoy for Afghanistan.

As of 1 September 2013 Vygaudas Ušackas serves as Ambassador, Head of the EU Delegation to the Russian Federation.

In 2019, Vygaudas Ušackas announced leaving politics to start a career in business.

Private life
He has two children: Raimundas, who was born in 1991, and Paula, born in 1993. In addition to the Lithuanian language, which is his native language, he is fluent in English, Russian and French. After leaving politics, Vygaudas Ušackas became Member of the Board of Directors at Avia Solutions Group.

References 
Vygaudas Ušackas (Lithuanian Embassy, UK; retrieved on 2008-12-03)

Living people
1964 births
Ministers of Foreign Affairs of Lithuania
Lithuanian jurists
Vilnius University alumni
Ambassadors of Lithuania to the United States
Ambassadors of Lithuania to Mexico
Ambassadors of Lithuania to the United Kingdom
Ambassadors of the European Union to Afghanistan
Ambassadors of the European Union to Russia
People from Skuodas
Lithuanian officials of the European Union
Recipients of the Order of the Cross of Terra Mariana, 2nd Class